The National Academy of Television Arts and Sciences (NATAS) is an American professional service organization founded in 1955 for "the advancement of the arts and sciences of television and the promotion of creative leadership for artistic, educational and technical achievements within the television industry". Headquartered in New York City, NATAS membership is national and the organization has local chapters around the country. It was also known as the National Television Academy until 2007. NATAS distributes several groups of Emmy Awards, including those for daytime, sports, and news and documentary programming.

Organization 

One of its past presidents, Don DeFore, was instrumental in arranging for the Emmy Awards to be broadcast on national TV for the first time on March 7, 1955. Other past presidents include Diana Muldaur, John Cannon, Peter Price, Frank Radice and Bob Mauro.

Programs 

NATAS distributes several groups of Emmy Awards, including the Daytime Emmy Awards, the Sports Emmy Awards, the News and Documentary Emmy Awards, the Technology and Engineering Emmy Awards, the Children's & Family Emmy Awards (to be first awarded in 2022), and "Public Service".

NATAS also supervised the Primetime Emmy Awards until a split between the East and West memberships in the 1970s led to the Academy of Television Arts & Sciences leaving NATAS. ATAS supervises the Primetime and Los Angeles area Emmys, while NATAS is in charge of the other Emmy honors. In 2007, the organization spawned a peer organization dedicated to new media, called the National Academy of Media Arts & Sciences (NAMAS).

NATAS published a magazine, Television Quarterly, which started in 1962.

19 Regional NATAS chapters organize award ceremonies of their own, awarding Emmy statues similar to those given out at the national ceremonies. They also administer their own regional scholarship and student productions award programs.

See also
 Academy of Television Arts & Sciences
 International Academy of Television Arts and Sciences
 Daytime Emmy Award
 Sports Emmy Award
 News & Documentary Emmy Award
 Children's & Family Emmy Award
 Technology & Engineering Emmy Award
 Academy of Interactive Arts & Sciences

References

External links
 

Television organizations in the United States
Arts organizations based in New York City
+
Arts organizations established in 1955
1955 establishments in New York City